Giga- is a prefix for one billion.

Giga may also refer to:

Music and dance 
 Gigue or giga: a Baroque dance
 Ģīga, a Latvian musical instrument
 Giga (instrument), a Scandinavian musical instrument

Other uses 
 Giga (brand), an adult game and visual novel brand
 Giga Pets, a series of virtual pets
 GIGA Television, a German TV station
 GIGA, German Institute of Global and Area Studies
GIGA (United Nations), a project to connect schools to the internet
 Isuzu Giga, truck series
 St.GIGA, a Japanese satellite radio station
 Ivan Vuković, or Giga, Montenegrin footballer

See also 
 Gega (disambiguation)